Holey Moley is an American sports reality competition television series created for ABC by Chris Culvenor. The series is produced by Eureka Productions and Unanimous Media, with Culvenor, Paul Franklin, Wesley Dening, Stephen Curry, Jeron Smith, Erick Peyton, Charles Wachter, and Michael O'Sullivan serving as executive producers.

The series features contestants competing against each other in a series of head-to-head, sudden-death matchups on a supersized miniature golf obstacle course. Curry stars as the resident golf pro, with play-by-play commentator Joe Tessitore, color commentator Rob Riggle, and sideline correspondent Jeannie Mai. In October 2018, ABC announced they were developing a miniature golf game show. The series was officially announced in April 2019, along with Curry's involvement. Filming of the series takes place at Sable Ranch in Canyon Country, Santa Clarita, California.

Holey Moley premiered on June 20, 2019, and its first season consisted of 10 episodes. In October 2019, ABC renewed the series for a second season, titled Holey Moley II: The Sequel, and premiered on May 21, 2020. In February 2021, it was announced that the series was renewed for a third and fourth season. The third season, titled Holey Moley 3D in 2D, premiered on June 17, 2021. The fourth season, titled Holey Moley Fore-Ever, and featuring the Muppets, premiered on May 3, 2022.

Production

Development
In October 2018, ABC released a casting call for a new game show called Mega Miniature Golf looking for miniature golfers to compete against each other for a grand prize. ABC officially announced the series in April 2019, with the title Holey Moley. Professional basketball player Stephen Curry serves as executive producer and resident golf pro on the series, with ABC Sports and ESPN sportscaster Joe Tessitore calling all the play-by-play commentary, comedian and actor Rob Riggle providing color commentary, and television personality Jeannie Mai as a sideline reporter (with Tessitore and Riggle wearing the same jackets that were worn by ABC Sports commentators in the 1970s). The series is produced by Eureka Productions and Unanimous Media, and created by Chris Culvenor, who is executive producing alongside Curry, Paul Franklin, Wesley Dening, Charles Wachter, Michael O'Sullivan, Jeron Smith, and Erick Peyton. Culvenor explained that producers saw that other television competition series were dominated by fitness enthusiasts and wanted to create a show that most people could partake in. He called the series "a serious competition put in a really silly world."

Filming
Filming for the series takes place at Sable Ranch in Canyon Country, Santa Clarita, California, which was previously used for the obstacle course game show Wipeout. Filming lasts several weeks and occurs late at night. The production films as many competitions as possible at each course on a given night, rather than simply filming the contents of a single episode each night. The golf course and obstacles were built on the ranch by The ATS Team, which creates obstacle courses and large-scale fanciful environments for shows such as American Ninja Warrior, The Titan Games, and Big Brother, in association with Eureka Productions. Tessitore indicated that some holes, such as Double Dutch Courage, remain standing because it is "a signature hole", but others are "shut down after three or four days". Filming for the first season took place on April 3–5 and 8–11, 2019. 

The second season was filmed in February and March 2020. The third and fourth seasons filmed back-to-back in March 2021, with a small number of recurring spectators due to the COVID-19 pandemic; additional footage of unmasked spectators filmed during previous seasons has been edited into these seasons.

Gameplay
In the first season, each episode consisted of 12 mini-golfers that compete in a series of head-to-head, sudden-death matchups on a supersized miniature golf obstacle course. Winners move on to round two and from there, only three will make it to the third and final round, where they compete on the "Mt. Holey Moley" hole in a three-way contest. The winner earns "The Golden Putter" trophy, a "Holey Moley" plaid jacket and a $25,000 grand prize.

In the second season onwards, it was changed to 8 mini-golfers each episode with a new miniature golf obstacle course. Round one and two remains the same head-to-head, sudden-death matchups with winners of each matchups moving on. Round three was changed to a head-to-head matchup. The winner still earns "The Golden Putter" trophy and a "Holey Moley" plaid jacket, but instead of the $25,000 cash prize, the winner earns a spot in the finale where they may have a chance to putt to win the $250,000 prize.

Holes
There are 39 holes.

Season 1
The larger-than-life mini-golf course for the first season features 10 supersized themed holes:
 Dutch Courage: Contestants must hit through a small mini-golf-style windmill situated in between two large windmills. The large windmills have four large, quickly rotating blades that can knock the player off the putting surface and cause stroke penalties. The hole lies past the second large windmill, on a slope.
 Caddysmack: The contestants try to hit their first putt closest to the big golf ball. The one closest gets to decide how their next shot will be hit, either by resident golf pro Stephen Curry or a robot voiced by Rob Riggle, with the losing contestant getting the other option. The robot and Curry hit 55-yard pitch shots to a turf-covered empty swimming pool where the hole is located. Caddysmack is the longest hole on the course.
 Arc de Trigolf: Players hit their ball along a large arc to the green, and then must get over a line of small raised platforms in a swimming pool to ring a bell and release a guillotine that will stop their ball from falling into the water.
 Tee'd Off: The loser on the 4-foot putt-off falls into the pool.
 Sweet Spot: The player tees off from a rapidly rotating platform toward another, less rapidly rotating platform where the hole is located. Several prop candies, like giant gumdrops, decorate the hole and act as obstacles.
 Surf or Turf: Contestants hit a ball up a large concave wave ramp 30 feet into the air, launching it backwards over their heads to an island green. If the ball does not land and stay on the green, the contestant must hit the ball across a skinny walkway instead after a one-stroke penalty.
 Slip N' Putt: The contestants must make their way atop an icy hill. The first one to the top gets the better placed ball. Then, they must hit their ball through the legs of the polar bear and slide their way down the hill to the green to complete the hole.
 The Distractor: Contestants must try to sink a 12-foot putt with a distraction.
 Log Roll: Contestants must putt up a hill and then climb it while avoiding rolling logs on rails.
 Mt. Holey Moley: Contestants must hit their ball up the side of a volcano into one of the crevasse holes. If they miss, their ball is placed far away and behind some rocks. If they place it in the holes, they get a better position—the smaller the hole, the better. They must then climb the volcano and zipline over the pool to land on a floating dock to reach the green; falling off the zipline and landing in the water will result in a one-stroke penalty.

Season 2
The course for the second season features 17 supersized themed holes (although it was originally reported to feature 18, like a traditional golf course. This fact was made fun of in the season finale, with Rob Riggle asking "Did we run out of money?"):
 Double Dutch Courage: Contestants must hit through two large windmills. Similar to Dutch Courage, the large windmills have five large, quickly rotating blades that can knock the player off the putting surface and cause stroke penalties. The hole lies past the second large windmill, on a slope.
 Putter Ducky: Contestants must putt past two oversized rubber ducks that swing from side to side. Afterwards, the players themselves must avoid the ducks. If a player gets knocked into the water (by a duck), they receive a one-stroke penalty.
 Slip N' Putt: The contestants must make their way atop an icy hill. The first one to the top gets the better placed ball. Then, they must hit their ball through the legs of the polar bear and slide their way down the hill to the green to complete the hole.
 Frankenputt: Players must putt through a series of electrical nodes and Dr. Frankenputt (a disguised Sir Goph)'s lair to the hole. Every stroke a player takes and misses the hole, they receive an electrical shock.
 Buns & Wieners: Players putt across a crevasse in a rotating hot dog bun before attempting to cross a creek filled with "burning coals" by clinging to one of three rotating hot dogs. Falling into the coals results in a one stroke penalty.
 Hole Number Two: Players must putt along a narrow ridge with water on one side and a row of porta-potties on the other, before attempting a 2.5-second sprint across the ridge before the porta-potty doors open and knock them into the water. If they fall into the water, they receive a one stroke penalty.
 Uranus: Similar to Arc de Trigolf, as contestants must putt the ball around the outer ring of Uranus. There is a channel where if the contestants land, could provide a shot at a hole in one. After the contestants putt (if the result is not a hole-in-one), they must traverse 4 planets to get to the green. If they fall in, they receive a stroke penalty.
 Polcano: Similar to Mount Holey Moley, but players zipline onto a narrow totem pole rather than across the entire water hazard. Falling into the water results in a one stroke penalty.
 Putt the Plank: Contestants must first putt across a pirate ship's bow towards a red X.  The closer to the red X gets a courtesy chip across the lagoon from pirate captain Long Jon Lovitz, while the other player gets a blindfolded courtesy chip. Then, they must cross the lagoon on the back of a shark to complete the hole, being careful not to fall in and get a penalty stroke.
 Gopher It: Two contestants must first ride on a mechanical gopher for as long as they can. Whoever can ride the gopher the longest will get the better ball placement on the course. The contestants must then put across a course with mechanical gopher heads popping up randomly. The contestant with the better ball placement only has to navigate around 2 gopher heads while the other must deal with a third.
 Dragon's Breath: Contestants wearing fireproof armor must putt the ball through one of three holes underneath a drawbridge in order to lower it and putt the ball in the hole. While the contestants are trying to putt, dragons breathe fire at the contestant.
 Beaver Creek: Players putt across a narrow strip before crossing a ditch via a rapidly rotating log. Falling into the ditch results in a one stroke penalty. Riggle often ridicules the hole for having a drab and empty ditch and for being a relative copy of Buns & Weiners.
 Diving Range: Three contestants first complete a dive of their choice judged by Olympic diver Greg Louganis, actor Steve Guttenberg, and Sir Goph. The contestant with the lowest score is eliminated; that contestant was always a ringer, former collegiate diver Joey Cifelli. (Sir Goph always gave his "score" as a picture, which Course Marshall Joe was left to interpret. Regardless of the object shown, it was always interpreted as a 4.) Of the remaining two contestants, the better score gets the better ball placement. They compete on a hole in which they must shoot past laneline obstacles to reach the hole in the center.
 The Distractor: Contestants must try to sink a 12-foot putt with a distraction.
 Water Hazard: Similar to Surf or Turf, in which players hit a ball over a water hazard via a 30-foot wave before attempting to cross a narrow bridge while being blasted with fire hoses. Falling into the water results in a one stroke penalty.
 Clowning Around: Appeared in the season finale. Each of the players is strapped into a circular apparatus in a standing position.  The apparatus is then turned several times to disorient the players, and the players eventually have to putt the magnetized ball upside down to a rectangular green.  Any miss gets a whipped-cream pie in the face from one of the clowns accompanying the hole.
 The Tomb of Nefer–Tee–Tee: Stephen Curry's much lauded finale hole, which appeared in the season finale. The hole is "all-or-nothing" hole, and eventually had nothing to do with the schematic shown all during the season.  Each player will get one shot to ace the hole per round, and only the person first holing the putt wins the jackpot grand prize of $250,000 and the Jeweled Putter of Nefer-Tee-Tee.  The hole is almost 100 feet in length, and contains three parts.  After an unassuming tee area, the ball then enters a repurposed spinning disc from Sweet Spot, this time containing three Egyptian-style pyramids and is colored as a desert.  Past that is the green, including walls on two sides and a crypt on the third (which opens when the winner is declared, containing the Jeweled Putter).  It also contains several small square obstacles, which could also aid the golfer in holing the putt.  If no golfer aces the hole after each has had a shot, the process continues until someone does.

Season 3
The course for the third season features 14 supersized themed holes and 1 portmanteau hole:
 Agony of Defeat: Contestants must "ski jump" into the water; the player with the longest jump gets the better ball placement. The hole name is presumably a reference to the "agony of defeat" clip of ski jumper Vinko Bogataj from the introduction to ABC's long-running Wide World of Sports series.
 Turfing USA: Players must putt the ball up and through a wave that runs alongside a pool and onto the green on the other side, guided onto the green by a small wall. After that, they must stand on a mechanically-driven surfboard in the same pool they putt past and ride it to the other side, standing up to both the sudden jerky movement of the board and water cannons. If they fall in, they incur a stroke penalty.
 Putt-a-Saurus: Both contestants race each other across the ribs of a dinosaur while over a tar (mud) pit; the ribs do not reach the end of the tar pit, so at one point all players will have to jump into the mud. The first player to reach and touch the bone finish line gets the better ball placement. After cleaning themselves off-camera, players putt up a ramp themed like a dinosaur spine and down a channel to the green; there is a small ridge that players must also try to navigate around for better putting positions off the ramp.
 Parcade: Similar to Uranus, players putt their ball up the launch ramp of a pinball machine. Once at the top, the ball falls into one of five channels that are themed after prior holes: Uranus, Dutch Courage (Windmill), Putt Bunyan, Putter Ducky, and The Tomb of Nefer-Tee-Tee; it is currently unknown what happens if the ball fails to reach any one of the five channels. The ball then ends on the green. After putting, each player must cross over a pool by jumping between two pinball flippers that rise up and down. Failing to do so incurs a stroke penalty.
 The Fishing Hole: Similar to Putter Ducky, in which contestants must putt past three oversized fish that swing from side to side. Afterwards, the players themselves must avoid the fish while being showered by a water cannon. If a player gets knocked into the water (by a fish), they receive a one-stroke penalty. As of November 2021, the hole is sponsored by a website promoting fishing.
 Holey Matrimony: Each player puts down the aisle to the green themed like a dance floor, complete with a disco ball in the center of a checkerboard pattern. After that, players run along a quickly moving treadmill "aisle" towards a spinning ring and cake over a pool. They must jump from the treadmill onto the ring and cake to reach the green. Falling into the water incurs a stroke penalty. To add to the theming, each player dresses up in a suit or a dress depending on gender; if two men are playing, both are dressed in suits, and if two women are playing, the women have a choice of a white suit or a dress.
 Ho Ho Hole: A rethemed Christmas version of Polcano, with the totem pole replaced by a candy cane "North Pole". The hole also has an added challenge of putting through fake snow, which hinders the ball from moving as quickly.
 Corn Hole: Similar to Hole Number Two, in which players must putt the ball down a huge piece of corn, and then walking through the same piece of corn. The giant kernels on the corn pop after 3 seconds, and if they get popped off the course into a pool full of foam squares that are designed to resemble popcorn kernels, they receive a one-stroke penalty. The hole itself rests on a slope that is themed to look like a cornhole board. This, Donut Hole, and The Pecker are the only holes in which players do not get wet if they fail.
 Donut Hole: Contestants hit their ball down a ramp covered in "sprinkles," which act as walls that guide the ball down to the green. They must then jump through three swinging donuts to reach the green; if players fall into a multicolored "sprinkle" foam square pit below, they incur a stroke penalty. This, Corn Hole, and The Pecker are the only holes in which the players do not get wet if they fail.
 Dutch Courage En Fuego: Similar to Double Dutch Courage, in which contestants must hit through two large windmills that exhale flames (the flames do not impact the hole, though they do emit smoke which makes it harder to see the blades of the windmills). The large windmills have five large, quickly rotating blades that can knock the player off the putting surface and cause stroke penalties. The hole lies past the second large windmill, on a slope.
 King Parthur's Court: Contestants putt down a channel and over a ramp across the water to a sword, banking their balls off to the hole. After putting, each player mounts on a mechanical horse and jousts with Sir Puttsalot, who tries to knock them off the horse into the water below. If they fall, players incur a stroke penalty.
 The Pecker: Players must putt the ball down a strip of wood to the green, and a channel on the side of the wood strip gives a chance for a hole-in-one.  They must then jump onto a bobbing woodpecker head and grab a red feather atop it; if they fail, it is a stroke penalty. This, Donut Hole, and Corn Hole are the only holes in which the players do not get wet if they fail.
 Hole Number Two: Players must putt along a narrow ridge with muddy water on one side and a row of porta-potties on the other, before attempting a 2.5-second sprint across the ridge before the porta-potty doors open and knock them into the mud. If they fall into the mud, they receive a one stroke penalty.
 The Distractor: Contestants must try to sink a 12-foot putt with a distraction.
 ParFishDutch: A portmanteau of the Parcade, The Fishing Hole, and Dutch Courage En Fuego courses in an epic 300-foot-long beast, which appeared in the season finale. In the Parcade area, players putt their ball up the launch ramp of a pinball machine. Once at the top, the ball falls into one of five channels that are themed after prior holes: Uranus, Dutch Courage (Windmill), Putt Bunyan, Putter Ducky, and The Tomb of Nefer-Tee-Tee; it is currently unknown what happens if the ball fails to reach any one of the five channels. The ball then lands on the green before the narrow ridge leading to The Fishing Hole. After putting, each player must cross over a pool by jumping between two pinball flippers that rise up and down, which will lead them to The Fishing Hole. Failing to do so incurs a stroke penalty. In The Fishing Hole section, the contestants then must putt past three oversized fish that swing from side to side, which will lead them to Dutch Courage En Fuego. Afterwards, the players themselves must avoid the fish while being showered by a water cannon. If a player gets knocked into the water (by a fish), they receive a one-stroke penalty. In the Dutch Courage En Fuego portion, the contestants next must hit through two large windmills, which have five large, quickly rotating blades that exhale flames (the flames do not impact the hole, though they do emit smoke which makes it harder to see the blades of the windmills). The large windmills have five large, quickly rotating blades that can knock the player off the putting surface and cause stroke penalties. The hole lies past the second large windmill, on a slope.

Season 4
The course for the fourth season features 14 supersized themed holes and 1 mashup hole:
 The Trap–Tee–Ze: Contestants hit their ball over a big curvy ramp to hit it on the other side. If their ball falls in the water, then the player must putt from the Drop Zone. Then they must swing from one trapeze to a Rob Riggle dummy. If they fall in the water, it’s a stroke penalty. 
 Donut Hole: Contestants hit their ball down a ramp covered in "sprinkles," which act as walls that guide the ball down to the green. They must then jump through three swinging donuts to reach the green; if players fall into a multicolored "sprinkle" foam square pit below, they incur a stroke penalty.
 Hole Number Two: Players must putt along a narrow ridge with muddy water on one side and a row of porta-potties on the other, before attempting a 2.5-second sprint across the ridge before the porta-potty doors open and knock them into the mud. If they fall into the mud, they receive a one stroke penalty.
 Corn Hole: Similar to Hole Number Two, in which players must putt the ball down a huge piece of corn, and then walking through the same piece of corn. The giant kernels on the corn pop after 3 seconds, and if they get popped off the course into a pool full of foam squares that are designed to resemble popcorn kernels, they receive a one-stroke penalty. The hole itself rests on a slope that is themed to look like a cornhole board.
 Dutch Courage En Fuego: Contestants must hit through two large windmills that exhale flames (the flames do not impact the hole, though they do emit smoke which makes it harder to see the blades of the windmills). The large windmills have five large, quickly rotating blades that can knock the player off the putting surface and cause stroke penalties. The hole lies past the second large windmill, on a slope.
 Polecano: This hole from Season 2 returns with a different spelling. Similar to Mount Holey Moley, but players zipline onto a narrow totem pole rather than across the entire water hazard. Falling into the water results in a one stroke penalty.
 Full Mooney: Players must putt the ball over a ramp and onto the green on the other side. After putting, they must stand atop a mechanically-driven moon and trot backwards to maintain their balance.  If they splash down into the water, they incur a one stroke penalty.
 Holeywood: Players will start by running on a moving red carpet and try to land on one of four stars. The better the star, the ball position. If they don’t land on the one of four stars, then the player would putt from the Riggle Drop Zone. Then players putt it out.
 The Fishing Hole: Contestants must putt past three oversized fish that swing from side to side. Afterwards, the players themselves must avoid the fish while being showered by a water cannon. If a player gets knocked into the water (by a fish), they receive a one-stroke penalty.
 Big Foot Wedge: Contestants hit their ball down a ramp Putt down a ramp, then swing on the big foot above the pit on a large golf ball. Jump off the ball to the—
 The Pecker: Players must putt the ball down a strip of wood to the green, and a channel on the side of the wood strip gives a chance for a hole-in-one.  They must then jump onto a bobbing woodpecker head and grab a red feather atop it; if they fail, it is a stroke penalty. This, Donut Hole, and Corn Hole are the only holes in which the players do not get wet if they fail.
 King Parthur's Court: Contestants putt down a channel and over a ramp across the water to a sword, banking their balls off to the hole. After putting, each player mounts on a mechanical horse and jousts with Sir Puttsalot, who tries to knock them off the horse into the water below. If they fall, players incur a stroke penalty.
 The Distractor: Contestants must try to sink a 12-foot putt with a distraction.
 Parcade: Appeared in the season finale, where players putt their ball up the launch ramp of a pinball machine. Once at the top, the ball falls into one of five channels that are themed after prior holes: Uranus, Dutch Courage (Windmill), Putt Bunyan, Putter Ducky, and The Tomb of Nefer-Tee-Tee; it is currently unknown what happens if the ball fails to reach any one of the five channels. The ball then ends on the green. After putting, each player must cross over a pool by jumping between two pinball flippers that rise up and down. Failing to do so incurs a stroke penalty.
 The Holeywood Distractor: A Holeywood version of The Distractor, which appeared in the season finale. Contestants must attempt to ace a lengthy putt over a ramp with a singing Jeannie Mai as the distraction. Muppet Miss Piggy was originally going to be present, only to have her trapped and locked alone in her trailer.

Episodes

Series overview

Season 1 (2019)

Season 2 (2020)

Season 3 (2021)

Season 4 (2022)

Specials

Release
The first season premiered on June 20, 2019, and consisted of 10 episodes. Global acquired the broadcast rights for Canada, and began simulcasting the series alongside the US broadcast on June 27, 2019. The series moved to CTV in Canada starting with season three.

Reception

Critical response
The review aggregator website Rotten Tomatoes reported a 92% approval rating for the first season, based on 12 reviews, with an average rating of 6/10. The website's consensus reads, "A fun, family-friendly show that benefits greatly from its hyperbolic hosts, Holey Moley is a delightful summer diversion." The second season has a 100% approval rating on Rotten Tomatoes, based on 5 reviews.

Ratings

Overview

Season 1

Season 2

Season 3

Season 4

Accolades

International versions

In October 2019, Australia's Seven Network announced it would be adapting the series for Australian audiences, produced by Eureka Productions. Initially slated for an August 2020 broadcast, the show started filming using an expanded version of the US course in California, but abandoned production in March 2020 due to the COVID-19 pandemic. The show later restarted filming on a set built in Australia in October 2020, with a new broadcast date set for early 2021. Greg Norman stars as the resident golf pro, alongside commentators Rob Riggle (reprising his role from the US version) and Matt Shirvington, along with host and sideline correspondent Sonia Kruger. The show premiered on February 1, 2021.

The Australian Holey Moley set is intended to be reused for potential international adaptations from Germany, the UK and France.

Notes

References

External links
 
 

2010s American comedy game shows
2010s American reality television series
2020s American comedy game shows
2020s American reality television series
2019 American television series debuts
American Broadcasting Company original programming
English-language television shows
Sports entertainment
Miniature golf
Golf on television
Television series by Disney–ABC Domestic Television
Television series by Eureka
Television shows filmed in Santa Clarita, California
The Muppets